Explorer S-45A was a NASA satellite, which was lost in a launch failure in 1961. The satellite was intended to operate in a highly elliptical orbit, from which it was to have provided data on the shape of the ionosphere, and on the Earth's magnetic field. It was part of the Explorer program, and would have been designated Explorer 12 had it reached orbit. It was the second of two identical satellites to be launched; the first, Explorer S-45, had also been lost in a launch failure, earlier in the year.

Launch 
Explorer S-45A was launched aboard a Juno II launch vehicle, serial number AM-19G. It was the final flight of the Juno II. The launch took place from LC-26B at the Cape Canaveral Air Force Station (CCAFS) at 19:48:05 GMT on 24 May 1961. The system which was intended to ignite the second stage malfunctioned, and as a result that stage failed to ignite. The launch vehicle failed to achieve orbit.

See also 

 Explorer program

References 

Spacecraft launched in 1961
Satellite launch failures